Kento Yachi (矢地 健人, born January 15, 1988) is a Japanese former professional baseball pitcher  in Japan's Nippon Professional Baseball. He played for the Chunichi Dragons from 2010 to 2013 and with the Chiba Lotte Marines in 2015.

External links

1988 births
Living people
Baseball people from Toyama Prefecture
Japanese baseball players
Nippon Professional Baseball pitchers
Chunichi Dragons players
Chiba Lotte Marines players